The Dawson Building (also known as the Eagles Home) is a historic commercial building located at 1851 Purchase Street in New Bedford, Massachusetts.

Description and history 
It is a four-story, brick Classical Revival style building, whose most prominent feature is a large octagonal turret at the corner. It was constructed in 1896 for Benjamin Dawson, a grocer and liquor distributor. In 1923, it was purchased by the New Bedford Aeire #647 Fraternal Order of Eagles. It was added to the National Register of Historic Places in 1982, and included in the Acushnet Heights Historic District in 1989. The building has since been converted into a 32-unit affordable housing apartment building.

See also
National Register of Historic Places listings in New Bedford, Massachusetts

References

Commercial buildings on the National Register of Historic Places in Massachusetts
Buildings and structures in New Bedford, Massachusetts
National Register of Historic Places in New Bedford, Massachusetts
Historic district contributing properties in Massachusetts

Buildings and structures completed in 1896
Fraternal Order of Eagles buildings